Charge transport mechanisms are theoretical models that aim to quantitatively describe the electric current flow through a given medium.

Theory
Crystalline solids and molecular solids are two opposite extreme cases of materials that exhibit substantially different transport mechanisms. While in atomic solids transport is intra-molecular, also known as band transport, in molecular solids the transport is inter-molecular, also known as hopping transport. The two different mechanisms result in different charge mobilities.

In disordered solids, disordered potentials result in weak localization effects (traps), which reduce the mean free path, and hence the mobility, of mobile charges. Carrier recombination also decreases mobility.

Starting with Ohm's law and using the definition of conductivity, it is possible to derive the following common expression for current as a function of carrier mobility μ and applied electric field E:

The relationship  holds when the concentration of localized states is significantly higher than the concentration of charge carriers, and assuming that hopping events are independent from each other.

Generally, the carrier mobility μ depends on temperature T, on the applied electric field E, and the concentration of localized states N. Depending on the model, increased temperature may either increase or decrease carrier mobility, applied electric field can increase mobility by contributing to thermal ionization of trapped charges, and increased concentration of localized states increases the mobility as well. Charge transport in the same material may have to be described by different models, depending on the applied field and temperature.

Concentration of localized states
Carrier mobility strongly depends on the concentration of localized states in a non-linear fashion. In the case of nearest-neighbour hopping, which is the limit of low concentrations, the following expression can be fitted to the experimental results:

This equation is characteristic of incoherent hopping transport, which takes place at low concentrations, where the limiting factor is the exponential decay of hopping probability with inter-site distance.

Sometimes this relation is expressed for conductivity, rather than mobility:

At high concentrations, a deviation from the nearest-neighbour model is observed, and variable-range hopping is used instead to describe transport. Variable range hopping can be used to describe disordered systems such as molecularly-doped polymers, low molecular weight glasses and conjugated polymers.

Temperature dependence
At low carrier densities, the Mott formula for temperature-dependent conductivity is used to describe hopping transport. In variable hopping it is given by:

where  is a parameter signifying a characteristic temperature. 
For low temperatures, assuming a parabolic shape of the density of states near the Fermi level, the conductivity is given by:

At high carrier densities, an Arrhenius dependence is observed:

In fact, the electrical conductivity of disordered materials under DC bias has a similar form for a large temperature range, also known as activated conduction:

Applied electric field
High electric fields cause an increase in the observed mobility:

It was shown that this relationship holds for a large range of field strengths.

AC conductivity
The real and imaginary parts of the AC conductivity for a large range of disordered semiconductors has the following form:

where C is a constant and s is usually smaller than unity.

In its original version the random barrier model (RBM) for AC conductivity in disordered solids predicted

Based on the almost exact Alexander-Orbach conjecture for the harmonic dimension of the percolation cluster, the following more accurate representation of the RBM AC conductivity was given in 2008

Ionic conduction
Similar to electron conduction, the electrical resistance of thin-film electrolytes depends on the applied electric field, such that when the thickness of the sample is reduced, the conductivity improves due to both the reduced thickness and the field-induced conductivity enhancement. The field dependence of the current density j through an ionic conductor, assuming a random walk model with independent ions under a periodic potential is given by:

where α is the inter-site separation.

Experimental determination of transport mechanisms
Characterization of transport properties requires fabricating a device and measuring its current-voltage characteristics. Devices for transport studies are typically fabricated by thin film deposition or break junctions. The dominant transport mechanism in a measured device can be determined by differential conductance analysis. In the differential form, the transport mechanism can be distinguished based on the voltage and temperature dependence of the current through the device.

It is common to express the mobility as a product of two terms, a field-independent term and a field-dependent term:

where  is the activation energy and β is model-dependent. For Poole–Frenkel hopping, for example,

Tunneling and thermionic emission are typically observed when the barrier height is low.
Thermally-assisted tunneling is a "hybrid" mechanism that attempts to describe a range of simultaneous behaviours, from tunneling to thermionic emission.

See also 
 Electron transfer

Further reading

References 

Electrical resistance and conductance
Charge carriers
Electrical phenomena